This is a list of the National Register of Historic Places listings in Mammoth Cave National Park.

This is intended to be a complete list of the properties and districts on the National Register of Historic Places in Mammoth Cave National Park, Kentucky, United States.  The locations of National Register properties and districts for which the latitude and longitude coordinates are included below, may be seen in a map.

There are 16 properties and districts listed on the National Register in the park.

Current listings 

|}

See also 
National Register of Historic Places listings in Hart County, Kentucky
National Register of Historic Places listings in Edmonson County, Kentucky
National Register of Historic Places listings in Kentucky

References 

Mammoth Cave National Park